Summer Rain is a 2006 romantic drama film directed by Spanish actor Antonio Banderas from a screenplay by Antonio Soler, based on his novel of the same name.

Plot
The film takes place in 1978 in Málaga, Spain, and depicts the life of teenager Miguelito Dávila, who after suffering from kidney disease and spending some time at the hospital, has learned such classic poetry as Dante's Divine Comedy and dreams of leaving his job at a hardware store and pursuing his dream of becoming a poet.

One summer, he hangs out with his childhood friends Babirusa, Paco Frontón and Moratalla, until he meets a girl called Luli at the swimming pool, and the two start dating. Luli would love to become a professional dancer, and is best friends with "La cuerpo", who fancies Miguelito's posh friend Paco. The two couples spend time together swimming, and they gradually experiment with other distractions.

Miguelito later meets an older teacher, who is interested in his talent, and begins an affair with her around the same time that Cardona, an older and apparently richer man, starts courting Luli with the promise of helping her career as a dancer.

Cast
  as Miguelito Dávila
 María Ruiz as Luli
 Félix Gómez as Paco Frontón
 Raúl Arévalo as Babirusa
 Fran Perea as "El Garganta"
 Marta Nieto as "La Cuerpo"
 Mario Casas as Moratalla
 Antonio Garrido as Cardona
 Victoria Abril as Ms. del Casco Cartaginés
 Victor Perez as González-Cortés

References

External links
 
 

2006 films
2006 romantic drama films
2000s coming-of-age drama films
2000s Spanish-language films
American coming-of-age drama films
American romantic drama films
British coming-of-age drama films
British romantic drama films
Coming-of-age romance films
Films about writers
Films based on Spanish novels
Films directed by Antonio Banderas
Films set in the 1970s
Films set in Málaga
Films shot in Andalusia
Films shot in London
Spanish coming-of-age drama films
Spanish romantic drama films
Sogecine films
2000s American films
2000s British films
2000s Spanish films